LHT HIGGS Produções Audiovisuais LTDA, better known by its trade name Brasil Paralelo, is a Brazilian company founded in 2016, in Porto Alegre, that produces historically revisionist and conservative documentaries about politics, history and current events. The videos are published on YouTube and have been shown since December 9, 2019 on TV Escola, a state television channel linked to the Ministry of Education and, since April 6, 2021, on the Panflix platform of the Jovem Pan group.

It emerged in the context of the conservative wave in Brazil in the 2010s. The producer places itself as a "connection to a parallel reality" and proposes to produce content that is inconsistent to the perspectives of the mainstream world of Brazilian intellectuals and journalists, which it considers dominated by the left.

Its productions include content that defend and promote the values of the political right and Christianity.

The company has been defined as close to the Bolsonaro government and its productions have been identified as aligned with the ideas of personalities of the Brazilian far-right such as Olavo de Carvalho, Jair Bolsonaro and Ernesto Araújo and have been criticized for distorting the history of Brazil and Portugal.

The screening on TV Escola was repudiated by the São Paulo regional association of the National History Association, which classified the material as "ideological propaganda by an extremist group", containing "lying and denialist versions of history". The producer claims that its contents are devoid of any political ideology and rejects the criticisms of academics and journalists and those contained in the entry on Wikipedia about the company.

In April 2021, the YouTube channel listed 421 videos, had 1.71 million subscribers and over 100 million views. According to a survey by the Aos Fatos agency, Brasil Paralelo is also the second largest Telegram channel in the world, with 80 thousand subscribers, losing to the profile of Allan dos Santos, from
Terça Livre.

History

LHT HIGGS Produções Audiovisuais LTDA was founded in Porto Alegre in 2016 by Lucas Ferrugem, Henrique Viana and Felipe Valerim, alumni of the Escola Superior de Propaganda e Marketing amid the rise of a conservative wave in Brazil. 
Felipe Valerim, stated that the company arose through "a group of young entrepreneurs, today partners of the project, who understood that the country was going through a new moment. Facing the political scenario of 2014, with the reelection of Dilma Rousseff, a awakening of political conscience gained more and more strength from the feeling of revolt of the majority of the population".

Before deciding on the fancy name, the team had decided on the names Brado, a word found in the Brazilian National Anthem, and Paralelo 15, the parallel that passes over Brasília. The name Brasil Paralelo was inspired by the movie Interstellar (2014), appreciated by the partners. According to them, the "name is a reference to a way of acting, totally independent of the State. After all, two parallel lines never meet." The company's logo, a black hole, refers to the idea of "connecting with a parallel reality",

since the company proposes to produce content that is inconsistent with the perspectives of the mainstream world among Brazilian intellectuals and journalists, which it considers dominated by the left. The logo was also inspired by the film:

Brasil Paralelo affirms that the production is done independently, non-partisan, exempt and based on a large information collection analyzed by specialists. According to the company, all resources come from the sale of subscriptions, which allow access to additional content.

However, divergent information was published by the newspaper Le Monde Diplomatique Brasil, which argues that since its origin the producer has been linked to a series of privileges in the coverage of political personalities not accessible to ordinary people, in addition to benefiting from the facilitation in raising funds from the National Film Agency (Ancine) for the production of a documentary on the election of Jair Bolsonaro.

In a note published on February 15, 2021, criticizing the entry in Wikipedia in Portuguese about the company, Brasil Paralelo explains:

In February 2017, for the sixth episode of the series of documentary films, the company collected 88 testimonies from right-wing opinion makers to launch a film about the Impeachment of Dilma Rousseff, as a counterpoint to the homonymous version produced with support from the Workers' Party (PT), focused on the narrative that the impeachment would have been a coup d'état. The title of the sixth episode was Impeachment - From the heyday to the fall, whose official launch took place on March 21, 2017, in São Paulo and Porto Alegre. In São Paulo, the premiere took place at Cinemark Metrô Santa Cruz and after the screening of the film, there was a live debate with Henrique Viana, Ícaro de Carvalho, Luiz Philippe of Orléans-Braganza, Hélio Beltrão and Joice Hasselmann. In the capital of Rio Grande do Sul, the premiere took place at Cinemark Barra Shopping Sul and, after the exhibition, there was a debate with Lucas Ferrugem, Felipe Moura Brasil, Guilherme Macalossi and Diego Casagrande. These were Brasil Paralelo's first face-to-face events. The following day the seminary "What to expect in 2017" was held at the Legislative Assembly of Rio Grande do Sul, with the presence of the journalist and architect Percival Puggina, diplomat Paulo Roberto de Almeida and deputy Marcel van Hattem, in which Brasil Paralelo's activities were discussed.

In April 2017, the company participated in the 30th edition of the Freedom Forum. The event is promoted by the Institute of Business Studies (IEE) and the edition took place at the Events Center of PUC/RS with lectures by João Doria, Pedro Malan, Eduardo Giannetti, Luiz Felipe Pondé, among others. At this event, Brasil Paralelo representatives exhibited, at the Unconference show, the entity's work in producing content and as an independent media alternative.

In early 2017, the production company had more than five thousand subscribers. In just six months of existence, the company earned more than R$1.5 million, as reported in the newspaper O Estado de S. Paulo, as it was contested by its founders. The company claims that its revenue comes from selling courses and exclusive content to subscribers and monetizing videos uploaded to YouTube, at the same time saying that its documentaries are free.
In September 2020, it reported that this last source of income was no longer in operation, having all its revenue from the sale of courses and content to subscribers.

On September 28, 2019, the company signed a contract with TV Escola, a state television channel linked to the Ministry of Education. With a three-year validity, the contract authorized the company's free and non-exclusive assignment of the rights to display one of its series to the channel. Thus, on December 9, 2019, the series Brasil, the Last Crusade began to be shown on TV Escola. which classified the material as "a piece of ideological propaganda by an extremist group", containing "lying and denialist versions of history", without support in national and international historiography.

According to a survey by the agency Aos Fatos published on February 4, 2021, Brasil Paralelo is the second largest Telegram channel in the world, with 80 thousand subscribers, second only to the profile of Allan dos Santos, from Terça Livre. The channel, however, was the only one of the 20 studied that presented in January of that year a reduction in the number of views and messages published.

Specialized criticism

Historians have criticized the company for the negationist and anti-intellectualist content of its videos, for distorting historical facts such as the military dictatorship, slavery and the colonization of Brazil and disseminating conspiracy and denialist theories
 promoted by Olavo de Carvalho, Jair Bolsonaro and Ernesto Araújo. Experts also pointed out that the content of the videos is cyber-activist and distorts the past
and classified the speech of some documentaries as an age-old and conspiracyist.

Paulo Pachá, professor of medieval history at the Fluminense Federal University, pointed out that the documentary Brazil: The Last Crusade has extreme right ideologies being published in Pacific Standard:

And then in text at the Public Agency:

In December 2019, the philosopher Paulo Ghiraldelli defined Brasil Paralelo as "the producer of Olavo [de Carvalho]", ideologue of the new Brazilian right, and said that it was an ideological rigging. He also criticized the quality of the content:

About the TV Escola exhibition of the Brasil series: the last crusade, the regional São Paulo of the National History Association (ANPUH-SP) issued a joint note with professors and students from the University of São Paulo, in which it classified the material as "a play of ideological propaganda of an extremist group", containing "lying and denialist versions of history", without support in national and international historiography:

In May 2020, Le Monde Diplomatique Brasil also classified the material produced as extreme right:

Historian Ítalo Nelli Borges pointed out political propaganda in the company's content:

The producer denies any political ideology and claims to have criticized "absolutely all political groups in the history of Brazil". He also explains that he interviews left-wing personalities:

Production

Brasil Paralelo has produced several series of documentaries, among which are:

 Parallel Brazil Congress (2016)
 Brazil: The Last Crusade (2017)
 The Day After Election (2018)
 The Theater of Scissors (2018)
 Vargas era: the twilight of an idol (2018)
 Homeland Educator: The Trilogy (2020)
 1964: Brazil between Arms and Books (2019)
 7 complaints: the consequences of the COVID-19 case (2020)
 The Owners of Truth (2020)
 The End of Nations (2020)
 The Supreme 11 (2020)
 The Great Minorities (2020)
 Christmas Special 2020 (2020)
 The Argentine Fall (2021)

The Brasil Parallel Congress series was the company's first and was made from video testimonials from Brazilian conservatism personalities, such as Hélio Beltrão, Olavo de Carvalho, Janaina Paschoal, Luiz Philippe of Orléans-Braganza, Luiz Felipe Pondé, Lobão, Rodrigo Constantino, Joice Hasselmann and Jair Bolsonaro. Following Brazil Parallel Congress, the episodes of Brazil: The Last Crusade between September 18, 2017, and April 9, 2018, were launched. An analysis of the discourse of the content presented in the second chapter of the series found the dissemination of ideas millenarianists and conspiracy theories, presenting a political-ideological and revisionist content disguised as historical. The analysis was made in June 2018 by history professor Roldão Carvalho Pires and social communicator Mara Rovida, from the University of Sorocaba. On December 9, 2019, the series was shown on the state television channel TV Escola.

With its premiere on August 21, 2018, Teatro das Tesouras approached the backstage of seven Brazilian presidential elections after the end of the Military Dictatorship established by the 1964 civil-military coup. And, entitled in reference to the motto of Dilma Rousseff's second government ("Brazil: Pátria Educadora"), Pátria Educadora: The Trilogy criticized education in Brazil and Paulo Freire in three episodes.

From 2019, the release of the 1964 documentary: Brazil between Arms and Books on the Cinemark cinema network was canceled due to protests against the relativization of state repression and torture during the Brazilian military dictatorship. The historian and professor of comparative literature, João Cezar de Castro Rocha, however, affirms, in his column in Veja magazine, that "the documentary does not support the dictatorship and explicitly condemns torture", although it also affirms that the premise of the film "favors the explanation of complex processes through conspiracy theories "and provides" support for Jair Bolsonaro's belligerent politics".
 Rocha also compared the role of the producer in the rise of Bolsonarism to the participation of the Institute of Research and Social Studies in the preparation of the Coup d'état in Brazil in 1964.

In the second half of 2020, he released two documentaries. The Owners of Truth sought to defend Abraham Weintraub's speeches through the argument of freedom of expression, while 7 complaints: the consequences of the COVID-19 case directed criticism to the measure of physical distance in the fight against the pandemic of COVID-19 and its formulators and disseminators. Both productions motivated the observation of adhesion by Brasil Paralelo to the "digital shock troop of the president" Jair Bolsonaro, expressed by journalist Fábio Zanini.

Fake news and accusation of fraud at the polls

The fact-checking agencies of Estadão and O Globo identified the transmission of fake news in two videos released close to the 2018 presidential elections on the Brazilian electronic ballot boxes.

In October 2018, during general election campaigns, the group posted a video on YouTube. A man identified as Hugo Cesar Hoeschl said that "international studies indicate that the likelihood of fraud in the last presidential election was 73.14%". This information was found to be false. The Superior Electoral Court (TSE) issued a note denying what was reported in the video, where it stated that "there is no record [...] that the author of the video participated in any audit and transparency event, such as the tests security procedures carried out by the TSE and the presentation of the source codes".

Even during the 2018 campaigns, experts denied Brasil Paralelo's accusation that there was fraud in the ballot boxes of the 2014 elections in Brazil. The accusation was based on Benford's Law, however, the Comprova Project checked the accusation and denied it concluding that the Benford Law alone is not sufficient to prove irregularities. Nevertheless, the Brasil Paralelo video already had approximately two million views at the time the check was published.

Proximity to Bolsonaro's pro-government media

Despite calling itself independent media and unrelated to political parties, Brasil Paralelo gained privileged access to the presidential inauguration of Jair Bolsonaro and also to the broadcast of one of its series by the state channel TV Escola during the government of that president, in addition to receiving broad support from Eduardo Bolsonaro through his Facebook account, disseminating videos and subscription plans.

In January 2019, free traffic conditions in the possession of President Jair Bolsonaro were granted to Brasil Paralelo, Terça Livre TV and Conexão Política, while journalists from various vehicles reported limitations on the journalistic coverage of possession, including food, restrooms. and access to authorities and sources.

In March 2019, after hearing experts, Deutsche Welle reported on Brazil Paralelo alongside other historical revisionists in the article "Historical negationism as a political weapon":

In April 2019, the cinema network Cinemark withdrew 1964 from the poster: Brazil between Arms and Books saying that it does not get involved with "political party issues [...] we do not authorize in our complex partisan media disclosure nor events of a nature political [...] we do not support political organizations or parties." After that, defenders of the dictatorship demonstrated on a social network calling for a boycott of Cinemark. Writing for Piauí magazine, Eduardo Escorel said that one of Brasil Paralelo's productions is didactic political propaganda:

In May 2019, a monitoring of social media profiles by the Agência Pública listed Brasil Paralelo as "part of alternative support sites for the Bolsonaro government" alongside the Terça Livre, Senso Incomum, Conexão Política, Reaçonaria and Renova Mídia. The monitoring was done to understand how a group of 54 supporters of Olavo de Carvalho try to influence the government's education agenda. On June 25, 2019, the company had its right of reply published by the newspaper O Globo, since it was granted by the 6th Civil Court of Porto Alegre because of the defamatory accusation present in a text published by the newspaper at the beginning of that year about the 1964 film - Brazil between Arms and Books produced by the company.

In the second half of 2020, he released two documentaries. The Owners of Truth sought to defend Abraham Weintraub's speeches through the argument of freedom of expression, while 7 complaints: the consequences of the COVID-19 case directed criticism to the measure of physical distance in the fight against the pandemic of COVID-19 and its formulators and disseminators. Both productions motivated the observation of adhesion by Brasil Paralelo to the "digital shock troop of the president" Jair Bolsonaro, expressed by journalist Fábio Zanini.

In relation to the launchings of Os Donos da Verdade and 7 complaints: the consequences of the COVID-19 case, journalist Fábio Zanini criticized the lower quality of production and the proximity to Bolsonaro's ideas and compared the producer to the Terça Livre channel:

In a report published on September 28, 2020, O Estado de S. Paulo defines the "Netflix 'company of the bolsonaristas". In the same report, Lucas Ferrugem, a partner at the company, stated that Brasil Paralelo has no relationship with Eduardo Bolsonaro or with the government's guidelines, although he has sympathy for Bolsonaro and feels represented in some guidelines.

Criticism to Wikipedia

In September 2020, the company's lawyer, identified as Fmdonadel on Wikipedia in Portuguese, requested on the entry's discussion page that the content be changed and suggested replacing the content with a version provided by him, since he understood that the article contained untrue information and "written to denigrate the company's image". According to him, Brasil Paralelo is "absolutely independent, non-partisan, devoid of ideological bias".

The entry about the company was protected, that is, newly created accounts were prevented from editing it. Lucas Ferrugem, one of the company's founders, classified the entry as "absurd and defamatory" and explained that the producer had tried to collaborate on the Wikipedia page, but "could no longer edit, correct information and submit new sources" and that is why his office would have entered the scene". Henrique Viana, another founder of the company, declared in Gazeta do Povo:

On February 15, 2021, the production staff issued a statement explaining that it was not a scam, as propagated in various media, both journalistic and academic, criticized the Wikipedia entry about the company and countered criticism from history teachers, journalists and  members of political parties. In the note, the producer rejects the classifications of extreme right, anti-intellectualist, negationist, cyberactivist, millenarian and 
revisionism.

See also

 Conservative wave
 Terça Livre

Bibliography

 Alcântara, Mauro Henrique Miranda de; Silva, Katiane da (2020). 
SimpoHis2020 Mídias e Tecnologias: Mauro Henrique Miranda de Alcântara e Katiane da Silva 6º Simpósio Eletrônico Internacional de Ensino de História. LAPHIS - Unespar. Trata-se, na verdade, de uma empresa de caráter privado, com o intuito de promover o revisionismo histórico. E por divulgar e propagar seu conteúdo no YouTube, por meio de divulgação paga, um/a estudante, ao buscar nesta plataforma sobre um determinado assunto da História do Brasil, terá accesso, antecipadamente, ao conteúdo desta empresa. Isso impacta, diretamente, no conhecimento histórico que, tanto o/a estudante, quanto o/a professor levará para sala de aula.

 Carvalho, Roldão Pires; Rovida, Mara (2020). «A propaganda do ticket conservador-liberal – uma análise do potencial ideológico do discurso do ativismo de direita». Questões Transversais - Revista de Epistemologias da Comunicação. V. 8 (n. 15). ISSN 2318-6372.
 Dias, André Bonsanto (2019). Um Brasil (em) Paralelo: as "verdades" da ditadura e sua historicidade mediada como um empreendimento político. XII Encontro Nacional de História da Mídia. Natal. ISSN 2175-6945. Nos parece fundamental perceber como este discurso está baseado sob premissas bastante paradoxais, no sentido de que an empresa parece se colocar em cima de um muro que ela mesma pretende derrubar. Ou seja, de accordo com esta perspectiva, existiria uma ideologia dominante responsável por encobrir a "verdadeira" história do país e o Brasil Paralelo, de forma comprometida e ao mesmo tempo "imparcial", iria revisitá-la não a seu bel prazer, mas para "resgatar" uma narrativa que nos havia sido negada e que todos mereciam receber.
 Luiz, Isabella Ferreira (2020). Negacionismo em rede: a negação da escravidão e da ditadura militar no Brasil ganhou an internet (PDF). XVII Encontro Regional de História (ANPUHPR). Maringá. Assim como os discursos negacionista sobre an escravidão no Brasil, tem-se cada vez mais um discurso que ora nega o período ditatorial, as mortes, as torturas e as prisões arbitrárias, ora busca exaltar os generais, o exército, as mortes e prisões, discurso esse que vem acompanhado da “defesa da moral e dos bons costumes” e que vem ganhando o espaço da internet e encontrou em canais como o Brasil Paralelo meios para florescer e alcançar um público ainda maior.
 Lopes, Reinaldo José (2017). Olavo de Carvalho afunda série do Brasil Paralelo Folha de S.Paulo. Cópia arquivada em 5 de janeiro de 2018. Atendendo a pedidos, analisei o ep. 1 da série de vídeos de história do Brasil Paralelo, que recebeu o título geral "Brasil: A Última Cruzada". Resultado: a perspectiva "cruzada" é interessante e importante, mas há uma série de erros bizarros também — dois deles cometidos por ninguém menos que Olavo de Carvalho.
 Lopes, Reinaldo José (2017). Brasil Paralelo: Erros bizarros e alguns acertos no ep. 1. Consultado em 16 de maio de 2020 – via YouTube. ...tem coisas que realmente é um foco interessante e importante. Agora, para quem quer ser ou parece que os caras querem ser a palavra definitiva, a visão revolucionária que vai mostrar a verdade sobre as origens de Portugal e do Brasil. Não. Não é isso e tem problemas sérios que deveriam ser corrigidos na minha opinião.
 Nicolazzi, Fernando (23 de março de 2019). A história da ditadura contada pelo Brasil Paralelo (por Fernando Nicolazzi) Sul 21. Cópia arquivada em 1 de abril de 2019. Ou seja, trata-se de uma obra com claro viés político e ideológico, resultando paradoxalmente em algo que seus próprios autores e colaboradores condenam. O problema, gostaria de deixar claro, não é an existência do viés, mas sua vergonhosa negação. Supondo, assim, ser este um produto que mostre como são "todos os conteúdos gerados" pela Brasil Paralelo, podemos já fazer algumas inferências a respeito do vídeo que estreará em 31 de março.
 Nicolazzi, Fernando (7 de abril de 2019). 2019 – O Brasil Paralelo entre o passado histórico e a picanha de papelão (por Fernando Nicolazzi) Sul 21. Cópia arquivada em 8 de abril de 2019. Estamos diante de uma instrumentalização e de uma falsidade por dois motivos bastante simples: meu artigo não dizia respeito diretamente ao vídeo em questão, tampouco sugeria qualquer tipo de boicote ou censura à sua exibição. Ou seja, ele aparece ali deslocado de seu contexto de origem e utilizado unicamente para repercutir o vídeo veiculado. Trata-se de marketing publicitário, não de uma verdade factual. Em outras palavras, se não estamos diante de uma mentira explicitamente enunciada, é certo que o que vemos é uma falsidade sugerida de forma implícita e que engana o espectador. Seria como, por exemplo, colocar uma imagem de garimpeiros de Serra Pelada realizada pelo fotógrafo Sebastião Salgado após o fim da ditadura para representar suppostos guerrilheiros encarados como responsáveis pelo início dessa mesma ditadura. Não apenas um erro cronológico, mas uma falsificação histórica.
 Ratier, Rodrigo (16 de dezembro de 2019). Rodrigo Ratier - TV ligada ao MEC traz História preconceituosa, diz especialista. UOL. Cópia arquivada em 23 de abril de 2020. A gente ainda não encontrou alternativas para fazer frente an esse tipo de estratégia que se ampara na mentira. De toda forma, essa discussão tem uma dimensão positiva, que é trazer para o primeiro plano an importância das demandas sociais pelo passado e do direito à democratização da História. Sobretudo, mostra a relevância do conhecimento histórico e da necessidade de ele ser produzido de forma honesta e com compromisso em relação à democracia.
 Vieira, Isadora Muniz (9 de outubro de 2019). Historiadoras/es e o paralelismo charlatão. HH Magazine: humanidades em rede. Cópia arquivada em 16 de maio de 2020. Sabemos que não se trata de oferecer a um público interessado por essas temáticas um conteúdo de qualidade. Menos ainda, trata-se de um compromisso de formar as pessoas historicamente e "expandir o intelecto". O objetivo é suprir uma demanda no mercado da conspiração, estabelecer um projeto nacional reacionário e lucrar com a desinformação. Como já pontuou o professor Fernando Nicolazzi, da UFRGS, o lucro por si só não deveria ser considerado um problema se o conteúdo vendido pela empresa não fosse intelectualmente desonesto e não tivesse a finalidade nefasta de desconstruir projetos políticos e sociais da nossa breve experiência democrática com revisionismo histórico barato (no sentido ruim da palavra, porque an assinatura do plano annual é de R$197,90). Acontece que esse paralelismo é paternalista, racista, sexista e avesso à pluralidade de ideias. É antidemocrátivo e autoritário. Vende conteúdo meramente opinativo e desprovido de constatações.

References

External links

 

Brazilian political websites
Economic liberalism
Denialism
Conservatism in Brazil
Neoconservatism
Far-right politics in Brazil
YouTube channels
Websites with far-right material
Conspiracist media
Internet properties established in 2016
2016 establishments in Brazil
Fake news websites